The ruins of Loropéni are a medieval heritage site near the town of Loropéni in southern Burkina Faso. They were added to the UNESCO World Heritage List in 2009. These ruins were the country's first World Heritage site. The site, which spans , includes an array of stone walls that comprised a medieval fortress, the best preserved of ten in the area. They date back at least a thousand years. The settlement was occupied by the Lohron or Kulango people and prospered from the trans-Saharan gold trade, reaching its height between the 14th and 17th centuries. It was abandoned in the early 19th century.

References

Further reading 
Somé, Magloire, and Lassina Simporé. Lieux de mémoire, patrimoine et histoire en Afrique de l’Ouest: Aux origines des Ruines de Loropéni, Burkina Faso. Archives contemporaines, 2014.
Royer, Bertrand. Le fil d’Ariane du patrimoine. Du musée ethnographique de Gaoua au site UNESCO de Loropéni (Burkina Faso). Géographie et cultures 79 (2011): 109-125.
Royer, Bertrand. "Patrimoine Mondial de l'Unesco et mise en valeur des ruines de Loropéni." Net et terrain: ethnographie de la n@ture en Afrique (2011): 94-122.

External links 
YouTube video by NHK Japan

World Heritage Sites in Burkina Faso
Archaeological sites in Burkina Faso
Archaeological sites of Western Africa